Amy Cohen-Corwin (formerly known as Amy C. Murray) is a professor emerita of mathematics at Rutgers University, and former Dean of University College at Rutgers University. In 2006, she was named Fellow of the American Association for the Advancement of Science. 

Cohen-Corwin is especially interested in the Korteweg–de Vries equation, cubic Schrödinger equation on the line, and improving undergraduate education, especially for future teachers. She worked on Project SEED whilst at the University of California, Berkeley in 1970 which fueled her interest in Mathematics education.

Cohen-Corwin has held numerous organizational positions, including Co-organizer for the AIM (American Institute of Mathematics) and NSF (National Science Foundation)-sponsored workshop "Finding and Keeping Graduate Students in the Mathematical Sciences."

Awards 
Louise Hay Award for Contributions to Mathematics Education, Joint Mathematics Meeting, Association for Women in Mathematics - 2013
Fellow, American Association for the Advancement of Science, elected 2006
Fellow, Association for Women in Mathematics, 2019

Education 
 Ph.D., 1970, Mathematics, University of California at Berkeley, under the supervision of Murray H. Protter
 M.S., 1966, Mathematics, University of California at Berkeley
 A.B., 1964, Mathematics, Harvard University (Radcliffe College)

References

External links 
 Rutgers Office for the Promotion of Women in Science, Technology, and Engineering

Living people
Rutgers University faculty
Radcliffe College alumni
UC Berkeley College of Letters and Science alumni
20th-century American mathematicians
21st-century American mathematicians
American women mathematicians
Fellows of the American Association for the Advancement of Science
Fellows of the Association for Women in Mathematics
20th-century women mathematicians
21st-century women mathematicians
Year of birth missing (living people)
20th-century American women
21st-century American women